Robyn Bliley is an American television and film producer and award-winning director.

Career
In 2002, Robyn co-founded Progressive Productions with cinematographer Chad Wilson. Her critically acclaimed first documentary feature, "Circus Rosaire" won numerous festival awards. She was Creator & Executive Producer of pilots for Discovery / Animal Planet and 20th Century Fox Television. She has produced and directed numerous commercials, branded content, and web series for AOL, Wal-Mart, Verizon, Lexus and others. Additionally, Robyn has directed hundreds of multi-camera live music programs with major recording artists such as Taylor Swift, Green Day, Gwen Stefani, Coldplay and Stevie Wonder.

Robyn started her career as an actress in Hollywood, with lead and guest-starring roles in more than two dozen television shows and movies.

References
Beifuss,J.: Commercial Appeal

Leydon,J.: Variety

Lowrey,K.: Pop Syndicate

Voynar,K.: Cinematical

Broadcast Engineering: Progressive Productions

External links

Official Website
Circus Rosaire Website

Living people
Year of birth missing (living people)
American film actresses
American film directors
American film producers
American women film producers
21st-century American women